The 2010–11 AHL season was the 75th season of the American Hockey League. An all-time high of thirty teams played 80 games each during the regular season schedule, which started on October 8, 2010, and ended on April 10, 2011. This season featured the addition of one new team, the relocation of two others, and the renaming of another.

Schedule
The 2010-11 AHL schedule, announced on August 25, 2010, consisted of 1,200 games held between October 8, 2010, and April 10, 2011. An outdoor game between Connecticut Whale and Providence Bruins was played at Rentschler Field on February 19, 2011. Providence won the game 5–4 in a shootout in front of 21,673 spectators.

Team and NHL affiliation changes

Team changes
The Albany River Rats moved to Charlotte, NC due to major financial losses. They became the Charlotte Checkers.
The Lowell Devils relocated to Albany, NY due to changes in the lease with UMass Lowell making it "financially impossible" to stay. They retained the Devils nickname.
The dormant Edmonton Road Runners were reactivated and moved to Oklahoma City, OK as the sixth incarnation of the Edmonton Oilers affiliate. The team played as the Oklahoma City Barons, thus making it the first time the franchise has set up operations in the United States.
The Hartford Wolf Pack were renamed the Connecticut Whale on November 27, 2010.

Affiliation changes

Standings 
 indicates team has clinched division and a playoff spot
 indicates team has clinched a playoff spot
 indicates team has been eliminated from playoff contention

Eastern Conference

Western Conference

Statistical leaders

Leading skaters 

The following players are sorted by points, then goals.

GP = Games played; G = Goals; A = Assists; Pts = Points; +/– = Plus-minus; PIM = Penalty minutes

Leading goaltenders 

The following goaltenders with a minimum 1500 minutes played lead the league in goals against average.

GP = Games played; TOI = Time on ice (in minutes); SA = Shots against; GA = Goals against; SO = Shutouts; GAA = Goals against average; SV% = Save percentage; W = Wins; L = Losses; OT = Overtime/shootout loss

Calder Cup playoffs

Bracket

AHL awards

See also
List of AHL seasons
2010 in ice hockey
2011 in ice hockey

References

External links
AHL official site

 
2010-11 Ahl Season
2
2